Walter F. Meserve (June 13, 1921 – October 1, 1984) was a Massachusetts politician who served as the acting Mayor of Lynn, Massachusetts.

Notes

Mayors of Lynn, Massachusetts
1921 births
1984 deaths
20th-century American politicians